Spruances Branch is a  long 2nd order tributary to the Leipsic River in Kent County, Delaware.

Course
Spruances Branch rises on the Finis Branch divide about 1 mile northwest of Whitehall Crossroads, Delaware.  Spruances Branch then flows south to meet the Leipsic River about 1-mile northwest of Leipsic.

Watershed
Spruances Branch drains  of area, receives about 45.1 in/year of precipitation, has a topographic wetness index of 627.60 and is about 05% forested.

References

Rivers of Delaware
Rivers of Kent County, Delaware
Tributaries of the Leipsic River